Saint Thomas of Villanova Healing a Lame Man is an oil on canvas painting by Murillo, created c. 1675, now held in the Alte Pinakothek in Munich, having been bought for Maximilian I Joseph of Bavaria by General Sebastiani in Paris in 1815.

References

Collection of the Alte Pinakothek
Paintings of saints
Paintings by Bartolomé Esteban Murillo
1675 paintings